Josaiah Ndubuisi Wachuku  (also spelled Josiah Wachukwu) was king, paramount chief, servant leader and Eze of Ngwa-land – in the then Aba Division of Eastern Nigeria – during British colonial times.

He was the father of Jaja Wachuku, the first Nigerian speaker of the House of Representatives of Nigeria, the first Nigerian ambassador and permanent representative to the United Nations, and first Nigerian minister of foreign affairs.
He was the grandfather of Chuku Wachuku, a United States-educated Nigerian economist and management specialist, and Nwabueze Nwokolo, a United Kingdom based lawyer.

References

1950 deaths
Igbo royalty
Igbo monarchs
Nigerian royalty
People from Abia State
Year of birth missing
Josaiah